Hugh B. Cramer (1915 – October 25, 2000) was an American politician. He served as a Democratic member of the Florida House of Representatives.

Life and career 
Cramer was born in North Tonawanda, New York.

In 1966, Cramer was elected to the Florida House of Representatives, serving until 1967.

Cramer died in October 2000, at the age of 85.

References 

1915 births
2000 deaths
People from North Tonawanda, New York
Democratic Party members of the Florida House of Representatives
20th-century American politicians